Born in Africa may refer to:

Born in Africa (Dr. Alban album), 1996
Born in Africa (song)
Born in Africa (compilation album), 1986 compilation album of various Ugandan artists